Gaul is a surname. Notable people with the surname include:

 Alfred R. Gaul (1837–1913), English composer and conductor
 August Gaul (1869–1922), German sculptor
 Charly Gaul (1932–2005), Luxembourgian cyclist
 David Gaul (1886–1962), American swimmer and 1904 Olympian
 Frank Gaul (born 1924), American politician
 Gilbert Gaul (artist) (1855–1919), American war artist
 Gilbert M. Gaul (born 1951), American journalist
 Harvey Bartlett Gaul (1881–1945), American composer
 Horace Gaul (1883–1939), ice hockey player
 Michael Gaul (born 1973), former professional ice hockey defenceman
 William Gaul (1850–1927), Bishop of Mashonaland

Ethnonymic surnames